Johannes-August Müürman (also Johannes-August Allikso, ; 29 November 1894 Nikolai Parish (now Kose Parish), Kreis Harrien – 26 April 1938 Soviet Union) was an Estonian politician. He was a member of I Riigikogu. On 19 October 1921, he resigned his position and he was replaced by Eduard Kägu.

References

1894 births
1938 deaths
People from Kose Parish
People from Kreis Harrien
Russian Social Democratic Labour Party members
Old Bolsheviks
Central Committee of Tallinn Trade Unions politicians
Communist Party of Estonia politicians
Members of the Riigikogu, 1920–1923
Estonian emigrants to the Soviet Union
Great Purge victims from Estonia